The Nature Reserve Bosco di Alcamo is  a natural protected area of Regione Siciliana established in 1984, and located on the top of monte Bonifato, which  dominates the town of Alcamo.

History 

Until the 19th century the Natural Reserve Bosco di Alcamo was covered with a broad-leaved wood which disappeared because of man's action. Since 1921 it has undergone a reforestation work with Aleppo'pine, cypress and umbrella pines. Later there was the gradual reappearance of species of local broad-leaved plants.

Territory 
The protected area is dominated by mount Bonifato, a pyramid-shaped calcareous mount 825 metres high s.l.m. near Alcamo, which has an area of 199 hectares. The surrounding landscape is agricultural and with the predominance of  vine growing.

Flora 
In ancient times on Mount Bonifato  there was a wood which was destroyed by the continuous fires and cutting down of timber.  The present forest, deriving from an old reforestation, expands on the northern side of the mountain and it is characterised by the presence of two species of pine, the maritime pine (Pinus pinaster) and Aleppo's pine (Pinus halepensis). ). There are also poor remainders of evergreen mediterranean forest among the rocks and in some strips of land, not influenced by human activities:  the holm oak, the ash tree, and the downy oak, the native essences.

There are also the typical  grassland and ampelodesma (or "disa"), which in the past was used to tie vines and realize ropes and baskets. Other important plants for the local handicraft are the Ferula (used  for the realization of chairs, stools and small tables), the dwarf palm tree (used to realize brooms or fill in matresses) Sicilian sumac . used for tanning skins and for dyeing works)[5] and the ash tree (from which they extracted manna).

Besides there is a remarkable presence of Euphorbia, Peony and orchidis (among which visitors can see the rare Orchis commutata and Orchis brancifortii).

There are also different aromatic plants, such as shrubby thyme, Egyptian rue, pennyroyal, rosemary, sage, absinth and oregano.

Fauna 
The forest hosts various kinds of birds such as: woodpigeons, jays, turtledoves, kestrels, thrushs, blackbirds, great spotted woodpeckers, robins, buzzards, woodcocks, great tits, greenfinches, serins, tits and goldfinches.

Among the  reptiles are found the rat snake, the endemic common snake (called  serpe nivura in dialect), the viper, the lizard and the green lizard.

There are also many mammals such as:porcupines, foxes, weasels, wild rabbits, hedgehogs.

Geological interest

Historical interest 

Inside and near the reserve there are remains of historical-cultural interest, among which:
 a necropolis of  prehistoric origin
  the Castle of Ventimiglia
  the Queen Gate
 the ruins of the fortified town Bùnifat, with old  unicellular buildings, cisterns and snow fields
 the water reservoir la Funtanazza.

Footpaths
The reserve is crossed by 3 footpaths:
 Saint Nicolas' path,1800 metres long
 The Orchidis' path, 850 metres long
 Panoramica Est,  2400 metres long

Accommodation 
A building on the edge of the pine wood  should carry out an activity of environmental education within the institutive ends of the reserve.

See also 
 Alcamo
 Monte Bonifato
 Aree naturali protette della Sicilia

Notes

Bibliography

External links 
 Riserva naturale Bosco di Alcamo su Parks.it. il portale dei Parchi italiani

Alcamo
Nature reserves in Italy